The Fultz Sisters or Fultz Quads, (May 23, 1946) became the first identical African-American quadruplets on record, and appeared in advertisements for PET baby formula.

Life  
The low chances of a couple conceiving quadruplets in the 1940s, decades before the availability of fertility treatments, and the fact that the family was poor and Black made the sisters' birth a sensational story that garnered national media attention. The Fultz Sisters — also known as the “Fultz Quads” — were the first identical African American quadruplets on record. They were born on May 23, 1946 at Cone Health Annie Penn Hospital in Reidsville, North Carolina. The sisters' parents were Pete Fultz and Annie Mae Fultz. The father was a sharecropper and the mother was deaf and mute; they were subsisting on a farm with six other children. The sisters were all delivered prematurely at three pounds each in a segregated wing known as “the basement” of Annie Penn Hospital. The delivery was accomplished by Dr. Fred Klenner and a Black nurse named Margaret Ware. The basement was considered the Blacks Only wing at the time. The hospital had no incubators, so the babies were wrapped in cotton gauze blankets and placed close to one another for warmth. The sisters were named Mary Louise, Mary Ann, Mary Alice, and Mary Catherine. The Fultzes were too poor to raise their children themselves, so Dr. Klenner and a nurse named Elma Saylor helped to provide the basic necessities for them. Dr. Klenner allegedly experimented with Mrs. Fultz by putting her on a high dosage of vitamin C in the later part of her pregnancy. Neither Pete nor Annie Mae could read, which Dr. Klenner allegedly exploited. Dr. Klenner took the responsibility of naming the children upon himself since the parents could not read. He decided to name them all Mary followed by the names of the women in the Klenner family. Ann was for Dr. Klenner's wife, Louise was for his daughter, Alice was for his aunt, and Catherine was for his great-aunt.

Impact of music 
Music was a large part of the Fultz sisters' lives. They went to Bethune–Cookman University to study music. They were accepted into the college as one unit and had received a four-year scholarship to attend there. While in college, the sisters were inseparable. But from having medical problems to skipping classes, their grades dropped drastically low. They attended the university for at least two years until the school asked their parents to remove them. The forced withdrawal from the school, according to their nurse Elma Saylor, eventually put the girls in a state of depression for a long time. They eventually returned home to live with Elma Saylor and her husband. The Fultz sisters still tried to maintain some sort of fame and decided to go into show business. They developed an amateur band at 22 years old and tried working in nightclubs. Among all four of the sisters, they eventually learned how to play the piano, guitar, viola, drums, cello, violin, and organ. As a group they were able to harmonize together, but each sister had different musical talents. Later, they all eventually became nurses' aides, following in the footsteps of their long-time caretaker Mrs. Saylor.

Fame and business deals with PET Milk Corporation 

Pet Milk targeted the Fultz sisters to help bring in Black urban consumers. This is mostly because during the era of the 1940s, Black communities did not buy baby formula because it was too expensive. This ultimately led to most mothers breastfeeding. Pet Milk negotiated a deal with Dr. Fred Klenner who reportedly turned down two other companies. Pet reportedly offered to pay all medical bills associated with the girls' birth, hire an in-home nurse, provide the girls with their own farm land, provide a house for the family, and pay $350 per month for their care. In November 1959, when the girls were 13, they performed as a string quarter in the annual Orange Blossom Festival in Miami, Florida. They also appeared in magazines such as Ebony. They first appeared in Ebony at age one. The Fultz sisters were so popular that at one point, there was an ad that offered an autographed picture of the sisters. The sisters also appeared on television shows and met presidents and celebrities such as John F Kennedy, Harry Truman, and Althea Gibson.

Deaths 
None of the Fultz sisters are living. Mary Louise died in 1991 at age 45, Mary Ann died in 1995 at age 49, Mary Alice died in 2001 at 55, and Mary Catherine in 2018 at 72. Their deaths were all caused by the same disease:  breast cancer. Before Mary Catherine passed away, she believed that this cancerous disease was caused from the shot in the hospital that was given to them when they were born. The fact that the Fultz sisters lived so long was quite impressive because their chances for survival, since their birth, were quite slim. Each of the Fultz sisters was born prematurely and with the expected birth of quadruplets they lacked the necessary equipment to treat them. The Fultz sisters went through treatment such as eye-dropper feeding and incubator nursing.

Cultural references 
A picture was taken of the sisters with President Kennedy, which is in the White House Archives or the JFK Library.
The sisters appeared in many Ebony magazine spreads and Black publications.
The sisters' story is described in "Skimmed: Breastfeeding, Race and Injustice" by Andrea Freeman

References

External links 

 Skimmed: Breastfeeding, Race, and Injustice

1946 births
African-American history of North Carolina
Quadruplets
1991 deaths
1995 deaths
2001 deaths
2018 deaths
Deaths from breast cancer